Basketball at the 1980 Summer Olympics was the tenth appearance of the sport of basketball as an official Olympic medal event. It was held from July 20 to July 30 at the Olympiiski Indoor Stadium and at the CSKA Sports Palace, both located in Moscow, Russian SFSR, Soviet Union. Finals of men's events were held 30 July at the Olympiiski Indoor Stadium.

Due to the American-led boycott of the 1980 Summer Olympics, the United States and other nations withdrew from the tournament. The 1980 Olympics marked the second time that the United States men's team did not win the gold medal in Olympic basketball;  Yugoslavia won gold in the men's tournament and the Soviet Union in the women's competition.

Medal summary

Qualification
A NOC may enter up to one men's team with 12 players and up to one women's team with 12 players. Automatic qualifications were granted to the host country for both events, plus the winning team at the 1978 FIBA World Championship and the gold medal winners at the 1976 Summer Olympics. The remaining spots were decided by corresponding continental qualifying tournaments for the men's competition, and in a tournament held months before the Olympic Games in Varna, Bulgaria for the women's event.

Men

Women

 Withdrew from the tournament.
 Replacement teams.

Format
Men's tournament:
 Three round-robin groups of four teams were formed, where the top two from each one advanced to the final round, and the remaining teams to the classification round.
 Both the final and classification round groups consisted of another round-robin of six teams each where results between teams from the same preliminary group were carried over. The top two teams from the final round competed for the gold medal, while third and fourth places for bronze.
 With the exception of the first four places, the final standings were decided by the corresponding places in each group.

Women's tournament:
 One round-robin group is formed containing all six teams, where the top two compete for the gold medal, while the third and fourth places compete for the bronze medal in an additional match.
 The remaining two teams finish with their group rank in the final standings.

Tie-breaking criteria:
 Head to head results
 Goal average (not the goal difference) between the tied teams
 Goal average of the tied teams for all teams in its group

Men's tournament

Preliminary round
The top two teams from each group advance to the final round group, while the remaining teams compete for 8th through 12th places in the classification group. Hosts Soviet Union and the world champions Yugoslavia advanced undefeated to the final round. Meanwhile, qualification in Group C was closely contested between Italy, Cuba and Australia, which ended up being decided by a third tiebreaker in favor of the first two teams.

Group A

Group B

Group C

Classification round
Results between Poland vs. Senegal, Australia vs. Sweden and Czechoslovakia vs. India were carried over from the preliminary round.

Semi-final round
The first two places in the final round compete for the gold medal, while the third and fourth places compete for the bronze. The remaining teams' group ranking determines their positions in the final standings. The host nation failed to compete for the gold in spite of finishing the preliminary round undefeated, due to losses against the other two group leaders Yugoslavia and  especially Italy, since the result from that match served as tiebreaker, giving the latter a passport to the gold medal match. The Soviet Union then won the bronze against Spain. Yugoslavia earned their first gold medal in men's basketball at this Olympic Games.

Results from Yugoslavia vs. Spain, Italy vs. Cuba and Soviet Union vs. Brazil were carried over from the preliminary round.

Medal matches

Bronze medal game

Gold medal game

Women's tournament
The women's tournament was decided in a round robin group with all six teams. The first two places competed for the gold medal, while the third and fourth places for the bronze. The remaining teams retain their group ranks for the final standings. The host nation finished the group phase undefeated and won the gold against Bulgaria. Yugoslavia would go on to win the bronze medal against Hungary.

Medal matches

Bronze medal game

Gold medal game

Final standings

See also
 Basketball at the 1980 Summer Olympics – Men's team rosters
 Basketball at the 1980 Summer Olympics – Women's team rosters

References

1980 Olympic Games: Tournament for Men, FIBA Archive.
1980 Olympic Games: Tournament for Women, FIBA Archive.
Men Basketball Olympic Games Moscow (URS) 1980 – 20–30.07 todor66.com.
Women Basketball Olympic Games Moskva (URS) 1980 – 20–30.07 todor66.com.

 
1980
1980 Summer Olympics events
Olympics
International basketball competitions hosted by the Soviet Union